A Treasure is a live album by Canadian / American musician Neil Young, released on June 14, 2011, featuring performances from his 1984-1985 U.S. tour with the International Harvesters. The album is volume nine in Young's Archives Performance Series and the sixth to be released.

Background
The album results from a tour following Young's recording what he later called the first Old Ways, an album of country music that his record company refused to release since they claimed it wasn't commercial enough. In this period, the early to mid-eighties, Young played music in many different genres. His backing band, the "International Harvesters", consisted of professional country musicians from Nashville some of whom had also played (as "The Shocking Pinks") on his rock and roll album Everybody's Rockin'. The album contains old Young songs and newer songs from Old Ways. It contains five previously unreleased songs (tracks 1, 5, 8, 11, and 12).

According to Young, the album's name comes from Ben Keith. "I hadn't heard these takes in 25 years, but when we unearthed them co-producer Ben Keith said, 'This is a treasure.'"

Track listing
All songs written by Neil Young except where indicated.

 "Amber Jean" – 3:17
 Recorded for Nashville Now TV, Nashville, 9/20/1984.
 "Are You Ready for the Country?" – 3:39
 Recorded at Riverbend Music Center, Cincinnati, 9/21/1984.
 "It Might Have Been" (Ronnie Green, Harriet Kane) – 2:43
 Recorded for Austin City Limits TV, Austin, 9/25/1984.
 "Bound for Glory" – 5:59
 Recorded at Gilleys Rodeo Arena, Pasadena, TX, 9/29/1984.
 "Let Your Fingers Do the Walking" – 3:03
 Recorded at Universal Amphitheater, Universal City, CA, 10/22/1984.
 "Flying on the Ground Is Wrong" – 4:48
 Recorded at Greek Theater, Berkeley, CA, 10/26/1984.
 "Motor City" – 3:22
 Recorded at Greek Theater, Berkeley, CA, 10/26/1984.
 "Soul of a Woman" – 4:28
 Recorded at Greek Theater, Berkeley, CA, 10/26/1984.
 "Get Back to the Country" – 2:31
 Recorded at Greek Theater, Berkeley, CA, 10/26/1984.
 "Southern Pacific" – 7:53
 Recorded at Minnesota State Fair, St. Paul, 9/1/1985.
 "Nothing Is Perfect" – 5:02
 Recorded at Minnesota State Fair, St. Paul, 9/1/1985.
 "Grey Riders" – 5:58
 Recorded at Pier 84, New York, 9/10/1985.

Personnel
Neil Young – guitar, vocals
Ben "Long Grain" Keith – pedal steel guitar, lap slide guitar, stringman, vocals
Anthony Crawford – guitar, banjo, vocals
Rufus Thibodeaux – fiddle
Spooner Oldham – piano
Tim Drummond – bass
Karl T. Himmel – drums
Hargus "Pig" Robbins – piano (on tracks 10, 11, 12)
Joe Allen – bass (on tracks 10, 11, 12)
Matraca Berg & Tracy Nelson – background vocals (on track 11)

Audio production
Recorded and mixed by Tim Mulligan, except track 1 by Terry Farris and track 3 by Jeff Peterson
Mastering by Tim Mulligan at Redwood Digital, Woodside CA
NYA Research by John Nowland and Joel Bernstein

Blu-ray production
Directed by Bernard Shakey
Produced by Will Mitchell
Executive Producer: Elliot Rabinowitz
Editor: Atticus Culver-Rease
Blu-ray Authoring, programming at MX, San Francisco, CA
Post Production at Upstream Multimedia
Graphics: Kris Kunz
Production Assistance: Hannah Johnson, Mark Faulkner
Licensing: Marcy Gensic
Research: Anthony Crawford, Archives Guy, Mark Golley
Archival concert video footage courtesy of: Jay Flanzraich, Robert Sampimon
“Nashville Now” footage used with permission by CMT
Additional footage courtesy of BBC, used with permission
International Harvesters photos courtesy of Pegi Young
Joe Allen photo: courtesy of Steve Cross

Tech notes and credits film:
Directed by Bernard Shakey
Produced by Neil Young
Camera: Benjamin Johnson
Sound: Will Mitchell

Chart performance

External links 
 Neil Young official site A Treasure page featuring a video of tech notes on the album

Notes

2011 live albums
Neil Young live albums
Albums produced by Neil Young
Albums produced by Ben Keith
Live country rock albums